Peiry is a surname. Notable people with the surname include: 

Lucienne Peiry (born 1961), Swiss art historian 
Michel Peiry (born 1959), Swiss serial killer

See also
Perry (surname)
Pery